Laar is a community in the district of Grafschaft Bentheim in Lower Saxony. The community’s name comes from the Old Dutch for “glade in the woods”.

Geography

Location
Laar lies northwest of Nordhorn on the German-Dutch border. It belongs to the Joint Community (Samtgemeinde) of Emlichheim, whose administrative seat is in the like-named town. The Vechte runs through the community.

Neighbouring communities
The community of Laar borders in the south on the communities of Wielen and Wilsum, in the east on the community of Emlichheim, in the north on the Dutch community of Coevorden and in the west on the Dutch community of Hardenberg in Overijssel.

Constituent communities
The community of Laar consists of the six constituent centres (Ortsteile) of Agterhorn, Echteler, Eschebrügge, Heesterkante, Laar and Vorwald.

Religion
Although Laar is a small village, it nonetheless has three church parishes: Evangelical-Reformed, Catholic and Evangelical-Old Reformed.

Politics

Municipal council
Laar’s council is made up of 13 councillors.
CDU 10 seats
SPD 1 seat
gbf 2 seats
(as of municipal election on 10 September 2006)

Mayor
The honorary mayor Jan Hindrik Zwaferink was elected at the municipal council’s constitutive meeting.

References

External links
 

County of Bentheim (district)